Athrips septempunctata is a moth of the family Gelechiidae. It is found in China (Gansu).

The wingspan is 16.5–17.5 mm. The forewings are yellowish cream mottled with numerous black-tipped scales. The veins are white and there are seven tufts of ochreous brown raised scales. The hindwings are grey.

References

Moths described in 1998
Athrips
Moths of Asia